The Pain – When Will It End? is a cartoon drawn by Tim Kreider (born February 25, 1967) from 1994 until June 8, 2009 (with sporadic updates through early 2013). The first editions were self-published, until the cartoon began running weekly in the Baltimore City Paper in 1997. It has since also been picked up by the Jackson Planet Weekly and The Indy in Bloomington-Normal, Illinois. From September 2000, it also appeared as a webcomic.

Many of Kreider's comics during the 2000s addressed issues in American politics from a point of view harshly critical of the George W. Bush administration. He is among the artists featured in Attitude 2: The New Subversive Alternative Cartoonists, edited by Ted Rall (2004). Kreider also received coverage in The New York Times in 2006 for his defense of Pluto as a planet before and after its demotion to dwarf planet.

Anthologies in book form have been published as The Pain – When Will It End? (May 2004), Why Do They Kill Me? (May 2005), and Twilight of the Assholes: Cartoons & Essays 2005–2009  (February 2011).  A limited-edition collection of his political cartoons, Fuck Them All, was published in September 2004. A collection of essays and cartoons, We Learn Nothing, was published in 2012.

References

External links
 
 Tim Kreider's website

Political webcomics
2000 webcomic debuts
1994 comics debuts